The 2022 Sacrifice was a professional wrestling event produced by Impact Wrestling. It took place on March 5, 2022, at Paristown Hall in Louisville, Kentucky, and aired on Impact Plus and YouTube. It was the 13th event under the Sacrifice chronology.

Twelve matches were contested at the event, including two on the pre-show and one taped as a digital exclusive. In the main event, Moose defeated Heath to retain the Impact World Championship. In other prominent matches, Violent By Design (Eric Young and Joe Doering) defeated The Good Brothers (Doc Gallows and Karl Anderson) to win the Impact World Tag Team Championship, Tasha Steelz defeated Mickie James to win the Impact Knockouts World Championship, and The Influence (Madison Rayne and Tenille Dashwood) defeated The IInspiration (Cassie Lee and Jessie McKay) to win the Impact Knockouts World Tag Team Championship.

Sacrifice garnered positive reviews from critics, with much praise being directed to the X Division title match between Jake Something and Trey Miguel.

Production

Background 
Sacrifice was an annual professional wrestling pay-per-view (PPV) event event produced by Impact Wrestling (then known as Total Nonstop Action Wrestling) that was first held in August 2005. The promotion's PPV schedule was reduced to four quarterly events in 2013, dropping Sacrifice. The event would return in 2014 and in 2016, the latter as a special edition of Impact!. The event would be revived in 2020 as a monthly special for Impact Plus.

On December 24, 2021, Impact Wrestling announced that Sacrifice would take place at Paristown Hall in Louisville, Kentucky on March 5, 2022.

Storylines 
The event featured several professional wrestling matches that involved different wrestlers from pre-existing scripted feuds, plots, and storylines. Wrestlers portrayed heroes, villains, or less distinguishable characters in scripted events that build tension and culminate in a wrestling match or series of matches. Storylines were produced on Impact Wrestling's weekly television programs: Impact! and Before the Impact.

The Influence (Madison Rayne and Tenille Dashwood) were originally slated to challenge The IInspiration (Cassie Lee and Jessie McKay) for the Impact Knockouts Tag Team Championship at Hard To Kill in January 2022. However, the match was cancelled due to The IInspiration having come into contact with someone who tested positive for COVID-19. On February 22, it was announced that the title match will now take place at Sacrifice.

At No Surrender, Jake Something defeated Ace Austin, Chris Bey, and Mike Bailey in a four-way match to become the number one contender to the Impact X Division Championship. On February 23, it was announced that Something will challenge defending champion Trey Miguel at Sacrifice.

At No Surrender, Honor No More (Matt Taven, Mike Bennett, Kenny King, PCO, and Vincent) defeated Team Impact (Chris Sabin, Rhino, Rich Swann, Steve Maclin, and Willie Mack) to earn their right to stay in Impact Wrestling, after the latter team was betrayed by Eddie Edwards. Edwards was found to be attacked backstage before the match, forcing Mack to take his place. However, Edwards would return during the match's climax and attacked Rhino and the rest of Team Impact before allowing King pin Rhino; turning heel and joining Honor No More in the process. Edwards would explain his actions on the February 24 episode of Impact!; after Kenny Omega won the Impact World Championship in a cross-promotional match at Rebellion in 2021, Edwards waited be chosen by Impact management to challenge for the title and "restore honor" to the company. Instead, it was Moose and Sami Callihan who both challenged and failed to beat Omega over the Summer. Feeling betrayed by Impact Wrestling (as well as by Ring of Honor, a company Edwards once wrestled for, going on a hiatus and releasing members of Honor No More from their contracts), Edwards would cost Team Impact the match at No Surrender. During that week's episode, Impact Executive Vice President Scott D'Amore would book a match between Rhino and Edwards for Sacrifice. Meanwhile, Jonah would be booked to face Honor No More's PCO. On March 2, it was announced that Swann and Mack will face Honor No More's Matt Taven and Mike Bennett on the "Countdown to Sacrifice" pre-show.

At No Surrender, Moose retained the Impact World Championship against W. Morrissey. On the February 24 episode of Impact!, Moose would take credit for Eddie Edwards' recent actions, citing how those he defeated and retained the title against (including Josh Alexander and Matt Cardona) had gone through downward spirals. Moose would then be interrupted by Heath, who was returning after the initial assault by Honor No More, and be challenged for the Impact World Championship at Sacrifice. Scott D'Amore, bewildered that Moose had no issue with Honor No More as long as they "stayed away" from his championship, officially booked a title match between Moose and Heath during a backstage segment.

At No Surrender, The Good Brothers (Doc Gallows and Karl Anderson) successfully retained the Impact World Tag Team Championship against the Guerillas of Destiny (Tama Tonga and Tanga Loa) after the latter team was betrayed by Bullet Club leader Jay White. Subsequently, Guerillas of Destiny (G.O.D.) was kicked out of Bullet Club and White reinstated The Good Brothers as members for the first time in nearly a decade. On the February 24 episode of Impact!, White announced that he would be facing his mentor, Alex Shelley, at Sacrifice. During the segment, Violent By Design (Eric Young, Deaner, and Joe Doering), who had been in a partnership with The Good Brothers, confronted the Bullet Club backstage. After White denied Violent By Design (VBD)'s request for a title match, G.O.D. would ambush the Bullet Club. It was later announced that The Good Brothers will defend the Impact World Tag Team Championship against VBD at Sacrifice.

At No Surrender, Mickie James defeated Tasha Steelz to retain the Impact Knockouts World Championship. On the following episode of Impact!, Steelz and her bodyguard Savannah Evans burst into executive producer Gail Kim's office, who was in talks with James and Chelsea Green about a title match at Sacrifice. Steelz objected to the idea, so Kim booked a number one contender's match for next week between Green and Steelz. Steelz would win the match, earning her another title opportunity against James at Sacrifice.

On the February 10 episode of Before the Impact, Lady Frost defeated Alisha Edwards. However, Frost's celebration would be cut short due to the debuting Gisele Shaw, who came down to the ring and ignored Frost entirely. The two would square off in a match the following week, where Shaw would pick up the victory. On the February 24 episode of Impact!, Frost answered Deonna Purrazzo's "Champ-Champ" open challenge, attempting to take Purrazzo's AAA Reina de Reinas Championship, but came up short. After the match, Shaw came down again, staring at Purrazzo before mocking Frost on her failure. The next week, when Shaw interrupted Purrazzo's interview time, Frost confronted Shaw to let her know  that the two of them would have a rematch on the "Countdown to Sacrifice" pre-show.

Event

Digital Media Exclusive Match 
Before the event went live, Mike Bailey defeated Aiden Prince which was aired as an Impact Digital Exclusive on March 8.

Countdown to Sacrifice 
Two matches were contested on the Countdown to Sacrifice pre-show. In the first match, Gisele Shaw fought against Lady Frost. In the end, Frost hit the "Frostbite" to get the victory.

In the second pre-show match, Rich Swann and Willie Mack took on Honor No More (Matt Taven and Mike Bennett). Maria Kanellis joined Tom Hannifan and Matthew Rehwoldt on commentary. In the end, Swann rolled up Bennett to get the win for his team.

Preliminary matches 
The opening match of the event was Jake Something against Trey Miguel for the X Division Championship.

Next, Eddie Edwards (with Honor No More) took on Rhino (with Chris Sabin, Rich Swann, and Willie Mack).

The third match was The Influence (Madison Rayne and Tenille Dashwood) versus The IInspiration (Cassie Lee and Jessie McKay) for the Knockouts World Tag Team Championship.

The fourth match involved Jonah against Honor No More's PCO.

The fifth match saw Bullet Club leader Jay White against Alex Shelley.

Next, Deonna Purrazzo entered the ring to start the "Champ-Champ" open challenge. Chelsea Green appeared and picked the ROH Women's World Championship to be on the line.

The penultimate match saw The Good Brothers (Doc Gallows and Karl Anderson) defending the Impact World Tag Team Championship against Violent By Design (Eric Young and Joe Doering) (with Deaner).

Main event 
In the main event, Moose defended the Impact World Championship against Heath. Anthony Carelli joined Hannifan and Rehwoldt on commentary.

Reception 
Steve Cook of 411Mania gave the event a 7.5 out of 10, which was the same rating as last year's event. He gave praise to the X-Division title match, Jonah-PCO and White-Shelley as the event's highlights, calling it a "Pretty solid outing from the Impact folks tonight ... we got some interesting title changes and Josh Alexander is back to be the workhorse of the company. Can't complain about that." Darrin Lilly of Pro Wrestling Torch praised the X-Division title opener, Jonah-PCO for being "a hard hitting match", and highlighted White-Shelley as "standout [match] of the night". He called it: "[A]n excellent show from top to bottom. The crowd was enthusiastic and engaged all the way through. There was a little of everything on this from brawling to high flying to technical wrestling." Bob Kapur of Slam Wrestling praised Something-Miguel for being "a good clash of quickness and aerials vs. smashmouth power", criticized White-Shelley for going "too long" and lacking a "smooth flow" to their bout, and felt the Impact World title main event carried "a very old-school feel, almost like an old 80s house show match." He rated the event 4.5 out of 5 stars, concluding that: "Impact put on another strong show with some very good in-ring action throughout. Combine the eventful results with the solid performances, and Sacrifice was one definitely worth watching.

Aftermath 
Two days later, Jake Something announced on his Twitter account that he is no longer with Impact Wrestling.

On March 8, Impact Wrestling announced that Trey Miguel will defend the Impact X Division Championship in a three-way match at Rebellion, with two other three-way matches to take place on following episodes of Impact! to determine his challengers.

On the March 24 episode of Impact!, Tasha Steelz ended her feud with Mickie James by successfully defending the Impact Knockouts World Championship in a Street Fight.

Results

Notes

References

External links 
 

2022 Impact Plus Monthly Special events
2022 in Kentucky
2022 in professional wrestling
Events in Louisville, Kentucky
Impact Wrestling Sacrifice
March 2022 events in the United States
Professional wrestling in Kentucky